Pallur refers to the following places:
 Pallur, Thrissur, a village in Thrissur district, Kerala, India]
 Pallur, Vellore district, Tamil Nadu, India
 Pallur, Anantapur district, Andhra Pradesh, India
 Palloor, a village in Mahe district, Puducherry, India